John Potestio (born 1939 in Grimaldi, Italy) immigrated to Canada in 1953. He is a graduate of the University of Western Ontario, (B.A.) and Lakehead University (M.A.) and was a teacher of history in Thunder Bay until his retirement in 1996. Presently, he is a sessional lecturer in Italian culture and language at Lakehead University.

He is the author of several books, including In Search of a Better Life: Emigration to Thunder Bay from a Small Town in Calabria (2000), The Memoirs of Giovanni Veltri (1987), and The History of Port Arthur, The Italian Mutual Benefit Society of Port Arthur (1985). He is also co-edited The Italian Immigrant Experience (1988) and Thunder Bay People (1987) with Antonio Pucci.

References

 The Italians of Thunder Bay, John Potestio, pp. 254–256   Chair of Italian Studies, Lakehead University publisher, Altona, Manitoba, CANADA, 2005.

1939 births
20th-century Canadian historians
Canadian male non-fiction writers
Italian emigrants to Canada
Living people
Writers from Thunder Bay
Academic staff of Lakehead University
Lakehead University alumni
21st-century Canadian historians